The Diving competition in the 1993 Summer Universiade were held in Buffalo, New York, USA.

Medal overview

Medal table

References
 
 

1993 Summer Universiade
1993
1993 in diving